Richard Lowndes may refer to:

Richard Garth née Richard Lowndes (1820–1903), Member of Parliament for Guildford (1866–1868) and Chief Justice of Bengal (1875–1886)
Richard Lowndes (MP) (?1707–1775), of Winslow, Buckinghamshire, English politician, Member of Parliament for Buckinghamshire (1741–1774)
Richard Lowndes (cricketer) (1821–1898), English cricketer and clergyman